Pinaki Das Chowdhury is an Indian politician and member of Tripura Legislative Assembly.

References

Tripura politicians